Yoplait is the world's largest franchise brand of yogurt. It is jointly owned by American food conglomerate General Mills and French dairy cooperative Sodiaal.

History
In 1964, 100,000 French farmers agreed to merge six regional dairy cooperatives in order to more efficiently market their products at the national level. In 1965, the Yoplait brand was launched as a new national brand, as a portmanteau of the brands of two member cooperatives, Yola and Coplait.

The company's logo is a six-petaled flower designed by Philippe Morlighem, each petal representing one of the six main cooperatives' founders. A redesigned logo, which has been slowly rolled out since the late 2000s, uses a flower with only five petals.

On 18 May 2011, General Mills announced it had agreed to purchase a controlling 51% interest in the brand's main operating company Yoplait SAS, and a 50% interest in a related company owning the brand's intellectual property, with Sodiaal retaining the remainder. The announcement of the completion of the acquisition was made on 1 July 2011.

World franchises

Australia
In Australia, Yoplait is locally manufactured by Lion Dairy & Drinks. In November 2019, China’s Mengniu Dairy announced the purchase of Lion from Japan’s Kirin Holdings. However, due to rising geopolitical tensions between China and Australia, Kirin and Mengniu announced the cancellation of the sale due to approval from Australian regulators being "unlikely to" materialize. It uses the slogan "Yoplait; French for Yum!".

Canada
In Canada, General Mills markets pre-stirred Yoplait yogurt, Minigo, Tubes, Source, Creamy, Delicieux, Yop, Yoplait Basket, Yoptimal, and Asana. In 1971, the Coopérative agricole de Granby, which went on to become the largest dairy cooperative in the country—Agropur—launched the Yoplait brand in Canada. In 1993, Agropur and Agrifoods (the two largest dairy cooperatives in Canada) combined their yogurt and fresh cheese marketing and manufacturing activities to form Ultima Foods. Ultima Foods oversaw Yoplait brand products throughout Canada until 2012, when General Mills took over the licence (Ultima Foods continues to manufacture Yoplait products in Canada as a subcontractor, but has also launched a wholly owned rival product line, iögo).

Chile 
In Chile the Yoplait brand is managed by Quillayes.

France 
In France, the Yoplait brand is managed by Yoplait France.

Ireland
In Ireland, Glanbia controlled the Yoplait brand from 1973 until 2017, when its dairy processing business was offloaded to form the joint venture Glanbia Ireland, with the Glanbia Co-operative Society holding 60% ownership and Glanbia 40%.

Israel
Yoplait in Israel is managed by Tnuva, Israel's largest dairy, and products are kosher. The company's drinkable yogurt comes in a 100-gram shot-style bottle with a center opening for easy gripping. Yoplait-brand flavored yogurts account for 42–52% of the Israeli market. Tnuva and Yoplait entered into a partnership to set up production facilities in Romania in 2007. In 2009, Tnuva introduced a  family-size yogurt called Yoplait YYY that comes in resealable containers.

Italy
Yoplait entered the Italian market in 1992 through a joint-venture between Sodiaal and Kraft Foods. At the end of the following year Yoplait achieved a market share of 2.5%. Yoplait withdrew from the Italian market in 1999.

Mexico
In Mexico, the Yoplait brand is managed by Sigma Alimentos.

Norway
The franchise in Norway is held by Fjordland, a brand of Tine, and has been since 1998. In 2014, Q-Meieriene filed suit against Fjordland for "allegedly copying a unique container for the Icelandic cultured milk product Skyr", as the latter uses a similar shape for one of its products.

Portugal
In Portugal, Yoplait was franchised to Gelgurte until 2010, when the franchising was not renewed with headquarters. It has not been made or sold in the country ever since.

Spain 
In 2001, the Soldier Spanish brand from Social stopped its production and commercialization in Spain closing its Alcobendas production plant.

South Korea
In South Korea, the Yoplait brand is managed and manufactured by Binggrae.

United Kingdom
In the United Kingdom, Yoplait UK Ltd is now 100% owned by Yoplait France. In April 2009, the joint venture between Yoplait and Dairy Crest ended. Yoplait UK Ltd is based in General Mills' European head office; Harman House in Uxbridge, London, United Kingdom. Tubed yogurts are called Frubes (portmanteau of fruit and tube) in the UK, half under the Petits Filous branding and half under the Wildlife Choobs branding. Petits Filous pots, Wildlife yogurt pots, Cal-in+ pot yogurts and yogurt drinks and Yop drinking yogurt are also sold in the UK and Ireland.

United States

The Yoplait brand first entered the United States in 1974 when it was licensed by the Michigan Cottage Cheese Company.  In 1977, General Mills acquired the U.S. marketing rights to Yoplait from that company, along with a yogurt plant in Reed City, Michigan.  General Mills has been the exclusive franchisee of the Yoplait brand in the United States ever since.

General Mills opened a plant in Carson, California to manufacture Yoplait for the West Coast, where it became the best-selling yogurt brand.  In 1981, General Mills began selling Yoplait on the East Coast.

Yoplait products are available in a variety of fruit-based flavors that come in a truncated-conical container sealed with an aluminum foil top. Under the Yoplait label, General Mills also markets Trix Yogurt, based on the flavors of their breakfast cereal of the same name, and Go-Gurt, where various flavors are packaged in plastic tubes for spoonless eating; these brands are targeted to children.  A probiotic line of yogurt is marketed under the brand name Yo-Plus.

During the 2000s and 2010s, Yoplait steadily lost market share in the United States to Greek yogurt brands, especially Chobani.  General Mills' attempts to market Greek yogurt versions of Yoplait repeatedly failed.  General Mills executives carefully studied these failures, concluded that what attracted consumers to Chobani was the charming authenticity of its rags-to-riches backstory, and decided to embrace the authenticity of the Yoplait brand's French heritage.

General Mills launched the Oui by Yoplait brand on 10 July 2017, by adapting and marketing an existing 20-year-old French product line, Yoplait Saveur d’Autrefois, as French-style yogurt.  Oui's selling point is that unlike most yogurts which are fermented in bulk and then poured fully formed into separate containers, all the ingredients are poured into separate glass jars and separately fermented in each jar.  This "pot-set" process supposedly stabilizes the yogurt without the need for additional ingredients like cornstarch or gelatin.

United Arab Emirates
In the United Arab Emirates, the Yoplait brand is a subsidiary of Agthia Group.

Community involvement
In the U.S., Yoplait participates in an annual program called "Save Lids to Save Lives" to raise money for breast cancer research. Yoplait donates ten cents per pink foil lid that is mailed to the company, but they state in fine print on all promotional materials that their donations will be capped at $2,000,000 per year. This money is donated to the Susan G. Komen Breast Cancer Foundation. Yoplait has been the primary sponsor of Race for the Cure, a marathon held to raise additional research money, since 2001.

The American franchise of Yoplait added a rim on the bottom of the yogurt containers to keep animals such as skunks from accidentally getting their heads caught. A label was added to the container stating: "Protect Wildlife: Crush Cup Before Disposal."

Controversy
The 2011 documentary Pink Ribbons, Inc. reported that some products sold under the "Save Lids to Save Lives" campaign had previously contained milk from cows treated with bovine somatotropin, a growth hormone banned in many nations for its possible link to diseases in humans, until the company agreed to remove it.

A 2012 television advertisement for Yoplait prompted criticism from the National Eating Disorders Association due to its portrayal of a woman making difficult food choices. The company announced within a few days of the complaint that they would pull the ad, saying, "We aren't sure that everyone saw the ad that way, but if anyone did, that was not our intent and is cause for concern."

Since at least 1998, Yoplait has been the target of a campaign by animal advocates, including the Humane Society, to redesign its traditional tapered cup design because small animals can easily get their heads stuck inside and then suffocate or die from dehydration.

See also

 Danone (Dannon)

References

External links
 Yoplait USA Homepage
 Yoplait Group Homepage 
 Yoplait Portugal Homepage

Brand name yogurts
General Mills brands
American companies established in 1965
French companies established in 1965
Food and drink companies established in 1965
Products introduced in 1965
1965 establishments in France
American brands
French brands
Kirin Group